Christopher Browne is an American filmmaker.

Christopher Browne may also refer to:

Chris Browne (artist) (born 1959), Australian artist
Christopher H. Browne (1946–2009), American value investor
Christopher Browne (MP), Member of Parliament (MP) for Stamford
Christopher Browne (screenwriter), screenwriter
Chris Browne (born 1952), American cartoonist

See also
Christopher Brown (disambiguation)